Nantua sauce (French: Sauce Nantua) is a classical French sauce consisting of:

a Béchamel sauce base
cream
crayfish butter
crayfish tails

It is named for the town of Nantua, which is known for its crayfish, and the term à la Nantua is used in classical French cuisine for dishes containing crayfish.

Sauce Nantua is the classic accompaniment to quenelles de brochet (pike dumplings), making quenelles Nantua.

References

French sauces
Cuisine of Auvergne-Rhône-Alpes
Crayfish dishes
Cuisine of Lyon